Masfout Cultural & Sports Club is a football club from Masfut, Ajman, United Arab Emirates. The club plays in the UAE Division One.

History
Masfout joined the UAE Division One in the 2012/13 season.

Current squad 

As of UAE Division One:

References

Football clubs in the United Arab Emirates
Association football clubs established in 1995
1995 establishments in the United Arab Emirates